Matthew Stuart "Matt" Busch (born September 22, 1972) is an American artist and entertainment illustrator.

He is currently a professor of Media and Communication Arts at Macomb Community College. He teaches a range of courses including figure illustration and commercial arts.

Early life
Busch was born in Lebanon, Pennsylvania on September 22, 1972, to Frederick and Peggy Busch. He grew up in the northern suburbs of Detroit, Michigan. After getting an associate degree from Macomb Community College, he moved to Pasadena, California, where he attended the Los Angeles Art Academy, and received a bachelor's degree from the Art Center College of Design. After living in Los Angeles for nearly a decade during the 1990s, Busch eventually returned to the Northern Detroit area where he set up his company, Planetmatt Entertainment, and continues to work on Hollywood projects, via new technology.

He is well known in many different circles of pop culture and fandom as an entertainment illustrator. Mostly known for his work with the Star Wars universe, Busch has provided numerous covers, posters, and other material for the franchise.

Career

Star Wars illustrator

Since 1994, Matt Busch has provided art for official Star Wars books, posters, magazines, and other products. Early in his career, Busch started illustrating products for the Star Wars: The Roleplaying Game and the cover for Star Wars: Tales from the Empire, which became a New York Times Best Seller. One of his more recent projects was illustrating the Style D One Sheet movie poster for Star Wars: Episode III – Revenge of the Sith.

Busch is perhaps best known for his outspoken antics in the You Can Draw Star Wars video series, which is based on the book of the same name, which he also illustrated. The video series was first released online and later released on DVD. Following that, the videos found even more success when they were released on MySpace.com, and shot straight to number one on their charts. Volume Two of the same tutorial series was also released on DVD.

In 2008, Hasbro released a droid action figure named MB-RA-7, which was named after Matt Busch.  Also that year, Busch became the first Honorary Member of the 501st Legion of Stormtroopers to become an official member with his own TK Stormtrooper armor.

In October 2009, he created and released Zombie Wars Episode I: The Zombie Menace, Zombie Wars Episode II: Attack of the Undead, Zombie Wars Episode III: Revenge of the Zombies, Zombie Wars Episode IV: A New Epidemic, Zombie Wars Episode V: The Living Dead Strike Back, and Zombie Wars Episode VI: Return from the Grave. A couple of months later, Kohl's department stores re-released an exclusive Boba Fett T-shirt featuring Busch's art.

Pop artist
Busch has contributed to comic books and trading cards, having worked on such properties as Afterburn, Alizarin's Journal, Coven 13, Lady Death, Night of the Living Dead, and Witchblade.

In 2009, Busch was hand-selected to illustrate President Obama for the cover of the DVD documentary, Becoming Barack: Evolution of a Leader. Busch also produced a bonus feature on the DVD.

Filmmaker
Having worked behind the scenes for years in many aspects of movie making, Busch eventually moved into the world of independent filmmaking. In 2006, his first feature-length movie, Conjure was released straight-to-DVD; a project that he wrote, directed, starred in, and even composed the music for. The movie gained critical acclaim and even shattered records in the Horror Genre.

In 2009, Busch released a DVD titled Illustration Nation, a documentary of travel adventures ranging from Hollywood to London to Tokyo.

Busch is currently filming and directing a trilogy titled Aladdin 3477 based on the classic Arabian Nights tale Aladdin and his Wonderful Lamp. The movie is set in Asia 1,500 years in the future. The first film is expected to be released at some point in 2023.

Personal life

Busch married his wife Lin Zy (née Selestow), a puppet designer, on September 18, 2011, in Royal Palm Beach, Florida. They reside in a multiple-studio house in Macomb Township, Michigan with their dog Roxie.

Filmography

Film

Film director

Television

Internet

Published books
 Hollywood is Dead, published by Planetmatt Entertainment (2014)

 Matt Busch's Sketchbook (Now With 90% More Bad-Ass!), published by Planetmatt Entertainment (December 2010)
 The Worlds of Matt Busch, published by Hermes Press (April 2008)
 You Can Draw Star Wars, published by DK Publishing (January 2007)
 Pucker: The Seductive Art of Matt Busch, published by SQP Publishing (September 2006)
 Fantastic Visions: The Art of Matt Busch, published by Avatar Press (September 2001)

See also
 Illustrator
 Filmmaking
 Storyboarding

References

External links
 Matt Busch's official website
 

Living people
1972 births
American illustrators
People from Lebanon, Pennsylvania
People from Macomb County, Michigan